Mattias Blomberg (born 1 April 1976) is a Swedish snowboarder. He competed in the men's snowboard cross event at the 2006 Winter Olympics.

References

External links
 

1976 births
Living people
Swedish male snowboarders
Olympic snowboarders of Sweden
Snowboarders at the 2006 Winter Olympics
People from Falun
Sportspeople from Dalarna County
21st-century Swedish people